

New Hartley Ponds is the name given to a Site of Special Scientific Interest (SSSI) in south-east Northumberland, England. The site comprises six seasonal ponds listed for their vegetation and newt population.

Location and natural features
New Hartley Ponds is situated in the north-east of England in the county of Northumberland, on the south-west fringe of the village of New Hartley. The six ponds on the  site are seasonal in nature.

Flora and fauna
The ponds are breeding grounds for five species of amphibians; notably the great-crested newt (Triturus cristatus), a species protected in the UK under Section 5 of the Wildlife and Countryside Act 1981, which at New Hartley can number 500 individuals. Populations of up to 1000 smooth newts (Lissotriton vulgaris), and occasional palmate newts (Lissotriton helveticus) are also found. Frogs and toads, numbering approximately 150 individuals each, and also found. The ponds are also home to two species of Damselfly - the blue-tailed damselfly (Ischnura elegans) and the common darter (Sympetrum striolatum).

Vegetation at the ponds includes amphibious bistort (Polygonum amphibium), common spike-rush (Eleocharis palustris), water horsetail (Equisetum fluviatile) and water crowfoot (Ranunculus aquatilis).

The condition of New Hartley Ponds was judged to be favourable, and described as 'outstanding' in 2010, with concerns expressed as to newts getting trapped in gully pots on the New Hartley Road.

See also
List of Sites of Special Scientific Interest in Northumberland

References

External links
Natural England SSSI record for New Hartley Ponds

Ponds of Europe
Sites of Special Scientific Interest in Northumberland
Sites of Special Scientific Interest notified in 1984